The Winston Wildcats were an indoor football team based in Piedmont Triad region of North Carolina. The Wildcats joined the professional American Indoor Football (AIF) as an expansion team in 2015. Following the 2016 season, the AIF ceased operations, leaving the Wildcats without a league. The Wildcats have periodically played as an independent against various teams in the local market. When they were in the AIF, their home games were at the LJVM Coliseum Annex in Winston-Salem, North Carolina. Since the 2019 season, they are based out of High Point, North Carolina, operating as a travel team called the High Point Wildcats in the Southern Steam's Elite Indoor Football, a league composed of a variety of professional to semi-professional indoor football teams. During the 2019 season, the team announced that coaches Malachi King, Dale Glossenger, and John Burns had purchased the team from Roderick Hinton and rebranded as the Carolina Wildcats.

The Wildcats were the first indoor football team to call Winston-Salem home since the Winston-Salem Energy, which played in the National Indoor Football League for the 2002 season before folding.

Statistics and records

Season-by-season results

Head coaches' record

2016 season

Schedule
Key:

Regular season
All start times were local to home team

* — Game was never scheduled to be played but was credited as forfeit win to the Wildcats one week after the non-played game with no explanation given by the AIF. (The Yellow Jackets were scheduled against the Maryland Eagles that week but had to forfeit due to the loss of their arena lease.)

Standings

2016 roster

References

External links
Winston Wildcats official website
High Point Wildcats website
American Indoor Football official website

Former American Indoor Football teams
American football teams in North Carolina
Sports in Winston-Salem, North Carolina
American football teams established in 2015
2015 establishments in North Carolina